A restricted military area or military out-of-bounds area is an area under military jurisdiction where special security measures are used to prevent unauthorized entry.

References

Military law